The 2008–09 Robert Morris Colonials men's basketball team represented Robert Morris University in the 2008–09 NCAA Division I basketball season. Robert Morris was coached by Mike Rice Jr. and played their home games at the Charles L. Sewall Center in Moon Township, PA. The Colonials were a members of the Northeast Conference. They finished the season 24–11, 15–3 in NEC play. They won the 2009 Northeast Conference men's basketball tournament to earn the conference's automatic bid to the 2009 NCAA Division I men's basketball tournament. They received the No. 15 seed in the Midwest Region and played No. 2 seed Michigan State in the first round, losing by a score of 77–62.

Roster

Schedule and results

|-
!colspan=9 style=| Regular season

|-
!colspan=9 style=| NEC tournament

|-
!colspan=10 style=| NCAA tournament

Source

Awards and honors
Jeremy Chappell – NEC Player of the Year

References

Robert Morris Colonials
Robert Morris
Robert Morris Colonials men's basketball seasons
Robert
Robert